Inape sororia is a species of moth of the family Tortricidae. It is found in Ecuador.

Subspecies
Inape sororia sororia (Ecuador: Napo Province, Morona Santiago Province)
Inape sororia corryssa Razowski & Pelz, 2006 (Ecuador: Azuay Province)
Inape sororia lojana Razowski & Pelz, 2006 (Ecuador: Loja Province)

References

External links

Moths described in 2006
Fauna of Ecuador
sororia
Moths of South America
Taxa named by Józef Razowski